Mount Eagle or Mounteagle may refer to:

Mount Eagle (plantation), historic plantation in Virginia, USA
Mount Eagle (U.S. Virgin Islands), highest summit on Island of Saint Croix
Mount Eagle (Ireland) (Sliabh an Iolair), 516m, a Marilyn in the Dingle Peninsula, Ireland
Mount Eagle (Scotland), 256m, a Marilyn on the Black Isle, Scotland
Mounteagle transmitting station, on the top of this hill
Mount Eagle (Chile) Chilean town.

See also
 Monteagle (disambiguation)